Teymurabad (also Romanized as Teymūrābād) is a village in Malavi Rural District, in the Central District of Pol-e Dokhtar County, Lorestan Province, Iran. At the 2006 census, its population was 183, in 37 families.

References 

Towns and villages in Pol-e Dokhtar County